Shulpin (or Shul'pin) is a Russian surname. Notable persons with the surname include:

 Georgiy Borisovich Shul’pin (born 1946), Russian chemist
 Leonid Mikhailovich Shulpin (1905–1941), Russian-Soviet ornithologist